Comostola laesaria is a moth of the family Geometridae first described by Francis Walker in 1861. It is found in Sri Lanka, India, Indochina, southern China, Taiwan, Sundaland, northern Australia and the Bismarck Archipelago.

The wingspan is about 20 mm. Adults are green with several red dots on each wing.

Larvae feed on the flowers of various plants, including Buchanania, Mangifera, Terminalia carolinensis, Melastomataceae, Melaleuca and Dimocarpus species. They are pale green or brown.

References

Moths described in 1861
Hemitheini